Kirthiga Reddy (born c.1971) is an Indian-American businesswoman and venture partner for SoftBank's US$100 billion Vision Fund. Reddy is SoftBank's first female investing partner and the former managing director of Facebook India.

She has the distinction of being the first employee of the social media giant in India and has been one of the leading forces behind the company's expansive growth in the country.

In 2011, she became Fortune India's Top 50 Most Powerful Women and also has been placed among India's 25 most influential women.

Career 
Reddy grew up in India. Born to middle-class parents, her father was a government employee. She finished her Bachelors in Computer Science and Engineering from MGM'S College of Engineering, Nanded under Dr. Babasaheb Ambedkar Marathwada University, Maharashtra and stood second. After her graduation, she moved to Nagpur along with her parents and then briefly worked helping Yashavant Kanetkar with the programming examples in his books to illustrate key concepts. She then moved to United States and did her Master's in business administration from Stanford University and an M.S. in computer engineering from Syracuse University.

Reddy has worked with established companies such as Silicon Graphics and Motorola. During her tenure at Silicon Graphics, she was the youngest director of engineering and the only woman at that level in her team. In 2008, Reddy moved back to India and started working with the US-based Phoenix Technologies.

In July 2010, Reddy Joined Facebook. As the first employee of the company in the country, not only did she start the India operations from scratch but also had to actually open the office shutters on day one.  Under her leadership, Facebook India has managed to not only grow its user base but also made significant contribution to its global business through ad sales with major tie-ups like Coca-Cola India and Yepme.

A day after shutting down 'Free Basics' scheme in India, Reddy announced her decision to step down from her post and relocate to the United States in six to twelve months.

On 12 February 2016, In her post in Facebook, she wrote: "When my family relocated to India, we knew that we would move back to the US some day. It's a bittersweet moment to share that the return timeframe is coming up in the next 6-12 months. Our two daughters start high school and middle school this coming year— which serves as a natural transition point to make this move back"

Personal life
She is married to her husband Dev and has two daughters - Ashna and Ariya.

References 

Living people
1970s births
Businesspeople from Chennai
Businesswomen from Tamil Nadu
Facebook employees
Stanford Graduate School of Business alumni
Syracuse University alumni
Dr. Babasaheb Ambedkar Marathwada University alumni